Ecclesiastical polity is the operational and governance structure of a church or of a Christian denomination. It also denotes the ministerial structure of a church and the authority relationships between churches. Polity relates closely to ecclesiology, the study of doctrine and theology relating to church organization.

Ecclesiastical polity is defined as both the subject of ecclesiastical government in the abstract and the particular system of government of a specific Christian organization. The phrase is sometimes used in civil law.

History
Questions of ecclesiastical government are first documented in the first chapters of the Acts of the Apostles and "theological debate about the nature, location, and exercise of authority, in the church" has been ongoing ever since. The first act recorded after the Ascension of Jesus Christ was the election of Saint Matthias as one of the Twelve Apostles, to replace Judas Iscariot. The Twelve Apostles were the first to instantiate the episcopal polity of Christianity.

During the Protestant Reformation, reformers asserted that the New Testament prescribed an ecclesiastical government different from the episcopal polity maintained by the Catholic Church, and consequently different Protestant bodies organized into different types of polities. During this period Richard Hooker wrote Of the Laws of Ecclesiastical Polity, the first volumes of which were published in 1594, to defend the polity of the Church of England against Puritan objections. It is from the title of this work that the term ecclesiastical polity may have originated.  With respect to ecclesiology, Hooker preferred the term polity to government as the former term "containeth both [the] government and also whatsoever besides belongeth to the ordering of the Church in public."

Types 
Though each church or denomination has its own characteristic structure, there are four general types of polity: episcopal, connexional, presbyterian, and congregational.

Episcopal polity

Churches having episcopal polity are governed by bishops. The title bishop comes from the Greek word , which translates as overseer. In regard to Catholicism, bishops have authority over the diocese, which is both sacramental and political; as well as performing ordinations, confirmations, and consecrations, the bishop supervises the clergy of the diocese and represents the diocese both secularly and in the hierarchy of church governance.

Bishops in this system may be subject to higher ranking bishops (variously called archbishops, metropolitan or patriarchs, depending upon the tradition; see also Bishop for further explanation of the varieties of bishops.) They also meet in councils or synods. These synods, subject to precedency by higher ranking bishops, may govern the dioceses which are represented in the council, though the synod may also be purely advisory.

Also, episcopal polity is not usually a simple chain of command. Instead, some authority may be held, not only by synods and colleges of bishops, but by lay and clerical councils. Further, patterns of authority are subject to a wide variety of historical rights and honours which may cut across simple lines of authority.

Episcopal polity is the predominant pattern in Catholic, Eastern Orthodox, Oriental Orthodox, and Anglican churches. It is also common in some Methodist and Lutheran churches, as well as amongst some of the African-American Pentecostal traditions in the United States such as the Church of God in Christ and the Full Gospel Baptist Church Fellowship.

Hierarchical polity
Some religious organizations, for example Seventh-day Adventist, Jehovah's Witnesses, The Salvation Army, and the Church of Jesus Christ of Latter-day Saints, describe their polity as hierarchical. In practice, such polities are similar to an episcopal polity, but often have a much more complex system of governance, with several dimensions of hierarchy. Leaders are not called bishops, and in some cases have secular-like titles such as president or overseer. The term bishop may be used to describe functionaries in minor leadership roles, such as a  leader of an individual congregation; it may also be used as an honorific, particularly within the Holiness movement.

Connexional polity

Many Methodist churches  use a derivative of episcopal polity known as connexionalism, or connexional polity. It emphasises essential interdependence, through fellowship, consultation, government and oversight. The traditional United Methodist Church defines connection as the principle that "all leaders and congregations are connected in a network of loyalties and commitments that support, yet supersede, local concerns." Some Methodist churches have bishops, but those individuals are not nearly as powerful as in episcopal churches.

Presbyterian polity

The lowest level council governs a single local church and is called the session or consistory; its members are called elders. The minister of the church (sometimes referred to as a teaching elder) is a member of and presides over the session; lay representatives (ruling elders or, informally, just elders) are elected by the congregation. The session sends representatives to the next level higher council, called the presbytery or classis. In some Presbyterian churches there are higher level councils (synods or general assemblies). Each council has authority over its constituents, and the representatives at each level are expected to use their own judgment. For example, each session approves and installs its own elders, and each presbytery approves the ministers serving within its territory and the connections between those ministers and particular congregations. Hence higher level councils act as courts of appeal for church trials and disputes, and it is not uncommon to see rulings and decisions overturned.

Presbyterian polity is the characteristic governance of Presbyterian churches, and also of churches in the Continental Reformed tradition. Elements of presbyterian polity are also found in other churches. For example, in the Episcopal Church in the United States of America, governance by bishops is paralleled by a system of deputies, who are lay and clerical representatives elected by parishes and, at the national level, by the dioceses. Legislation in the general convention requires the separate consent of the bishops and of the deputies.

Note that in episcopal polity, presbyter refers to a priest.

Congregational polity

Congregational churches dispense with titled positions such as bishop as a requirement of church structure. The local congregation rules itself, elects its own leaders, both clergy and laity, ordains its own clergy, and as a "self-governed voluntary institution", is a type of religious anarchism. Appointment of local leaders and councils by external authorities derives from a separate bureaucratic or associational polity.

Members may be sent from the congregation to associations that are sometimes identified with the church bodies formed by Presbyterians, Lutherans, Anglicans, and other non-congregational Protestants. Neither the congregations nor the associations exercise any control over each other, other than having the ability to terminate membership in the association. Many congregationalist churches are completely independent in principle. One major exception is ordination of clergy, where even congregationalist churches often invite members of the vicinage or association to ordain their pastors.

It is a principle of congregationalism that ministers do not govern congregations by themselves. They may preside over the congregation, but it is the congregation which exerts its authority in the end.

Churches that traditionally practice congregational polity include congregationalists, Baptists, and many forms of nondenominational Christianity.  Because of its prevalence among Baptists, and the prominence of Baptists among Protestant denominations, congregational polity is sometimes called Baptist polity.

Polity, autonomy, and ecumenism
Although a church's polity determines its ministers and discipline, it need not affect relations with other Christian organizations. The unity of a church is an essential doctrine of ecclesiology, but because the divisions between churches presuppose the absence of mutual authority, internal polity does not directly answer how these divisions are treated.

For example, among churches of episcopal polity, different theories are expressed:
 In Eastern Orthodoxy the various churches retain autonomy but are held to be unified by common doctrine and conciliarity, i. e., subjection to the authority of councils, such as ecumenical councils, Holy Synods, and the former standing council, the Endemusa Synod.
 The Roman Catholic Church understands herself as a single polity whose supreme earthly authority is the Supreme Pontiff (Pope).
 In Anglicanism the churches are autonomous, though the majority of members are organizationally united in the Anglican Communion, which has no governmental authority.

Plurality and singularity

Plurality refers to systems of ecclesiastical polity wherein the local church's decisions are made by a committee, typically called elders. The system is in contrast to the "singularity" of episcopal polity systems as used in Roman Catholic, Eastern Orthodox, and Anglican churches, or the pastor/president system of some Protestant churches.

Plurality of elders is commonly encouraged, with variation of practice, among Presbyterians, some Pentecostal churches, and Churches of Christ, the Disciples of Christ and the Plymouth Brethren (who employ congregational polity). The practice claims biblical precedent, acknowledging that churches in the time of the New Testament appear to all have had multiple elders.

In the Church of England, two or more otherwise independent benefices may be 'held in plurality''' by a single priest.

See also

 Hierarchy of the Catholic Church
 Organizational structure of Jehovah's Witnesses
 Polity of the Seventh-day Adventist Church

References
Footnotes

Bibliography

 
 
 
 
 
 
 

Further reading

 A study of religious authority (especially pp. 97–218) as well as the secular authority of the state.
 A study of the conflict and prestige of episcopal church authority with other forms of church polity as they affect inter-Christian relations and ecumenism.

External links
Ecclesiastical polity at the Encyclopædia Britannica''

 
Christian terminology
Ecclesiastical polities